Borat is a 2006 mockumentary comedy film directed by Larry Charles.

Borat may also refer to:
 Borat (caste), a Chuhra tribe in Pakistan and India
 Borat Sagdiyev, a fictional character starring in the film Borat and other media
 Borat's Television Programme, a 2-episode spin-off television program aired on British television station Channel 4

See also
 Borate
Borut (disambiguation)
Borot (disambiguation)
Boral

mk:Борат#Филм